In zoology, a tentacle is a flexible, mobile, and elongated organ present in some species of animals, most of them invertebrates. In animal anatomy, tentacles usually occur in one or more pairs. Anatomically, the tentacles of animals work mainly like muscular hydrostats. Most forms of tentacles are used for grasping and feeding. Many are sensory organs, variously receptive to touch, vision, or to the smell or taste of particular foods or threats. Examples of such tentacles are the eyestalks of various kinds of snails. Some kinds of tentacles have both sensory and manipulatory functions.

A tentacle is similar to a cirrus, but a cirrus is an organ that usually lacks the tentacle's strength, size, flexibility, or sensitivity.  A nautilus has cirri, but a squid has tentacles.

Invertebrates

Molluscs

Many molluscs have tentacles of one form or another. The most familiar are those of the pulmonate land snails, which usually have two sets of tentacles on the head: when extended the upper pair have eyes at their tips; the lower pair are chemoreceptors. Both pairs are fully retractable muscular hydrostats, but they are not used for manipulation or prey capture.

Some marine snails such as abalone and top snails, Trochidae, have numerous small tentacles around the edge of the mantle. These are known as pallial tentacles.

Among cephalopods, squid have spectacular tentacles. They take the form of highly mobile muscular hydrostats with various appendages such as suction disks and sometimes thorny hooks. Up to the early twentieth century "tentacles" were interchangeably called "arms". The modern convention, however, is to speak of appendages as "tentacles" when they have relatively thin "peduncles" or "stalks" with "clubs" at their tips. In contrast the convention refers to the relatively shorter appendages as "arms". By this definition the eight appendages of octopuses, though quite long, count as arms. It is worth noting, however, that while arms are distinct from tentacles (a definition specific to the limb featuring peduncles), arms do fall within the general definition of "tentacle" as "a flexible, mobile, and elongated organ" and "tentacle" could be used as an umbrella term.

The tentacles of the giant squid and colossal squid have powerful suckers and pointed teeth at the ends. The teeth of the giant squid resemble bottle caps and function like tiny hole saws, while the tentacles of the colossal squid wield two long rows of swiveling, tri-pointed hooks.

Cnidarians and ctenophores
Cnidarians, such as jellyfish, sea anemones, Hydra and coral have numerous hair-like tentacles. Cnidarians have huge numbers of cnidocytes on their tentacles. In medusoid form, the body floats on water so that the tentacles hang down in a ring around the mouth. In polyp form, such as sea anemone and coral, the body is below with the tentacles pointed upwards.

Many species of the jellyfish-like ctenophores have two tentacles, while some have none. Their tentacles have adhesive structures called colloblasts or lasso cells. The colloblasts burst open when prey comes in contact with the tentacle, releasing sticky threads that secure the food.

They are hollow and are arranged in 8 groups of between 70 and 150. The longer tentacles are equipped with cnidocytes whose venom paralyses and kills prey. The smaller tentacles guide food into the mouth.

Bryozoa

Bryozoa (moss animals) are tiny creatures with tentacles around their mouths. The tentacles are almost cylindrical and have bands of cilia which create a water current towards the mouth. The animal extracts edible material from the flow of water.

Trypanorhynch cestodes

Trypanorhynch cestodes are parasitic in fish. Their scolex shows four tentacles which are covered by spines. These tentacles help the adult cestode to attach to the intestine of the shark or ray that they parasitize. The same tentacles are also present in the larvae.

Vertebrates

Amphibians
The legless amphibians called caecilians have two short tentacles, one on each side of the head, between their eyes and nostrils. The current opinion is that these tentacles supplement the normal sense of smell, possibly for navigation and to locate prey underground.

Mammals
The star-nosed mole, Condylura cristata, of North America, has 22 short but conspicuous tentacles around its nose. They are mobile and extremely sensitive, helping the animal to find its way about the burrow and detect prey. They are about 1–4 mm long and hold about 25,000 touch receptors called Eimer's organs, perhaps giving this mole the most delicate sense of touch among mammals.

Tentillum 

The word tentillum (pl. tentilla) literally means "little tentacle". However, irrespective of size, it usually refers to a side branch of a larger tentacle. In some cases such tentilla are specialised for particular functions; for example, in the Cnidaria tentilla usually bear cnidocytes, whereas in the Ctenophora they usually have collocytes. Siphonophores are an example of Cnidaria that use tentilla.

References

External links

Tentacle at About.com
Tentacle at the Encyclopædia Britannica

Animal anatomy
Animal morphology